Hadley Wood Golf Course is a golf course in Hadley Wood, in the London Borough of Enfield. The course opened in 1922 in the grounds of Beech Hill Park, a grade II listed building. The associated stables are also grade II listed. The course was designed by Dr. Alister MacKenzie.

References 

Golf clubs and courses in London
Hadley Wood
Golf clubs and courses designed by Alister MacKenzie
1922 establishments in England